This is a list of Yazidi temples across the world.

Background
Yazidis are an ethnoreligious group who live predominantly in northern Iraq. Their religion is known as Yazidism.

List

See also 

 List of Yazidi saints
 List of Yazidi settlements
 Yazidism
 Yazidis

References 

Yazidi
Yazidi